The County Fair is a 1920 American silent drama film directed by Edmund Mortimer and Maurice Tourneur. It's based on a 1889 play with the same title by Charles Barnard.

Plot
As summarized in a film publication, Aunt Abigail (Chapman) and her adopted daughter Sally (Eddy) are threatened with the loss of their home through foreclosure of a mortgage held by Solon Hammerhead (Mong). The only outlets available are either for Abigail to marry the old villain Salon or for Sally to marry his mean, scheming son Bruce (Housman). To prevent Aunt Abigail from losing her home, Sally is about to agree to marry the son, even though she loves the hired hand Joel (Butler). She has only a few days to decide before the mortgage falls due.

That night former jockey Tim Vail breaks into the home looking for food, and sweet Aunt Abigail gives him a job on the farm. Tim discovers that Abigail's horse "Cold Molasses" is a born racer, and Tim and Joel get permission to train the horse for the big $3000 race at the County Fair, which takes place the day the mortgage comes due. The Hammerheads, discovering that the horse would likely beat their entry, attempt to keep her out of the race by setting fire to the barn, but Tim rescues the horse. The big race starts with Cold Molasses in the lead. At the last second the Hammerhead horse passes her and it looks like the house will be gone, but then the Hammerhead entry is disqualified for foul play. The winnings pay off the mortgage, Joel and Sally are happy, and even Aunt Abigail finds a suitor.

Cast 
Helen Jerome Eddy as Sally Greenway
David Butler as Joel Bartlett
Edythe Chapman as Aunt Abigail Prue
William V. Mong as Solon Hammerhead
Arthur Housman as Bruce Hammerhead
John Steppling as Otis Tucker
Charles Barton as Tim Vail
Wesley Barry as Tommy Perkins

References

External links 

1920 films
American silent feature films
1920 drama films
1920s English-language films
American black-and-white films
American films based on plays
Silent American drama films
Films directed by Edmund Mortimer
Films directed by Maurice Tourneur
American horse racing films
1920s American films